Gephyromantis tschenki, commonly known as Tschenk's Madagascar frog, is a species of frogs in the family Mantellidae.  It is endemic to Madagascar.  Its natural habitats are subtropical or tropical moist lowland forests, subtropical or tropical moist montane forests, and rivers.  It is threatened by habitat loss.

Sources

tschenki
Endemic fauna of Madagascar
Frogs of Africa
Amphibians described in 2001
Taxonomy articles created by Polbot